Arthur Thomas Lloyd (13 December 184429 May 1907) was an Anglican bishop. He served as Bishop of Thetford (suffragan bishop to the Bishop of Norwich, 1894–1903) and as Bishop of Newcastle (1903–1907).

Family and education
The son of Henry W. Lloyd, vicar of Cholsey, and Georgiana Etough, and a brother to F. C. Lloyd (who became vicar of Cholsey, 1890–1895, and later vicar of Kew, Surrey), Arthur was educated at Magdalen School and St Edmund Hall, Oxford.

Priest
Ordained a priest by Samuel Wilberforce, Bishop of Oxford, on 21 February 1869 at St Luke's Maidenhead, his first post was as his father's curate at Cholsey (1868–1873), his second was curate-in-charge of Watlington, Oxfordshire (1873–1876), from where he moved to become vicar of Aylesbury (1876–1882). After some time as the first vicar of Newcastle upon Tyne after the parish church became Newcastle Cathedral (he was also an honorary canon and rural dean), he was appointed to be vicar of North Creake and Archdeacon of Lynn, becoming also the first modern Bishop of Thetford (suffragan to the Bishop of Norwich) in 1894.

Bishop
He was ordained and consecrated a bishop by Edward White Benson, Archbishop of Canterbury, at Westminster Abbey, on St Luke's Day (18 October) 1894. In 1903 he was translated (he was nominated on 11 May and installed on 4 June) to become the third Bishop of Newcastle and died in post four years later.

Death and legacy
A bachelor who had "always lived" with his sisters, Lloyd died on 29 May 1907 at his sister's house in South Kensington, London. He was buried "as a commoner" on 3 June at St James's parish church, Benwell, where he had lived at Benwell Towers, the bishop's palace; there is, however, an alabaster memorial to him at Newcastle Cathedral. The cathedral memorial was unveiled at a large service on 29 July 1919. On 11 March 2012, Martin Wharton, Bishop of Newcastle, rededicated Lloyd's grave at Benwell, following its restoration after serious neglect.

References

1844 births
1907 deaths
People educated at Magdalen College School, Oxford
Alumni of St Edmund Hall, Oxford
Archdeacons of Lynn
Bishops of Thetford
Bishops of Newcastle
20th-century Church of England bishops